Packer Park is a neighborhood in the South Philadelphia section of Philadelphia, Pennsylvania that originally included 1,000 homes built in two unique builder developments of Packer Park 1950s and Brinton Estates 1990s. It is now one of four residential communities to be designated as Packer Park. The original footprint community is also one of four adjacent communities that form Philadelphia's Sports Complex Special Services District.  The approximate boundaries are Packer Avenue to the north, Hartranft Street to the south including FDR Park farther south, Broad Street to the east known as the Southern Parkway and I-76 to the far west. Packer Park has been considered home to one of the most organized community groups in the South Philadelphia region.

Overview 
The area was a section of Passyunk Township, Pennsylvania, a defunct township that was located in Philadelphia County, Pennsylvania originally occupied by settlers from New Sweden. The township ceased to exist and was incorporated into the City of Philadelphia following the passage of the Act of Consolidation, 1854. The American Swedish Historical Museum located in Franklin Delano Roosevelt Park on the southern border of the Packer Park community memorializes the Swedish ethnic history.

To the immediate east is the South Philadelphia sports complex consisting of Citizens Bank Park, Lincoln Financial Field, Wachovia Spectrum, Wachovia Center, and the dining complex of Xfinity Live!. This was also the former site of now demolished Veterans Stadium, the Spectrum and John F. Kennedy Stadium.

Packer Park 
Packer Avenue itself was named in honor of William Fisher Packer, a former governor of Pennsylvania, and was built as an approach to the American International exposition grounds of the Sesquicentennial Exposition of 1926. Following 1926, the exposition was demolished and the US Navy built temporary housing on the site. The Navy abandoned the site and moved families to new housing west of Penrose Avenue. This opened up the site to the private development of Packer Park on what was reclaimed swampy land and preserving the vitality of the borders of Board Street's Southern Blvd, together with the Olmsted Brothers architecturally designed landscaped FDR Park on the south and Marconi Plaza, Philadelphia, Pennsylvania Park on the upper north. FDR Park is 348 acres (1.41 km2) which includes a 146-acre (0.59 km2) golf course, about 125 acres (0.51 km2) of buildings and managed landscapes, and about 77 acres (310,000 m2) of natural lands including ponds and lagoons. Also on the south side from Packer Avenue to Hartranft Street is the Philadelphia Eagles Football Practice Field, Novacare Center and Vendemmia Square maintaining large green areas from the site of the former U.S. Naval Hospital. Along the six blocks from Broad Street to 20th on Hartranft Street is a landscaped pedestrian walkway park lined with trees and seasonal plants, nicknamed the "Gladway" (memorializing the 1926 Sesquicentennial Exposition green area of rows of hundreds of Gladiolus).

The Packer Park urban townhouses distinguish themselves in South Philadelphia by departing from the Philadelphia grid of streets and blocks of dense rowhomes. This included cul-de-sacs that were designed with a greater emphasis on a green park setting with common green spaces and accommodation for driveways and off street car parking. The community soon became populated by a large second-generation Italian immigrant population and continues to be an Italian American neighborhood like much of South Philadelphia.

Geary Estates
Most recently 10 new townhomes have been built on the block of 1900 Geary St at the site of the former Holy Spirit convent. Geary Estates in Packer Park are 3-story, new-construction homes with luxury amenities, including two-car parking, decks, skyline views, a finished basement, granite counters, stainless steel appliances, luxury cabinetry, ten-year tax abatements, etc.

West (The Reserve)
The Packer Park community name expanded in 2003–2007 adjacent to the original footprint became known as the "Reserve" at Packer Park, a separate housing development of 230 homes built on a triangular land area to the west of 20th Street, north of Pattison, east of Penrose Avenue. The Reserve was built on what was formerly a United States naval housing site, built in 1962 and abandoned in 1995 after the Cold War. The Capehart property, a designated ACT II site, housed nearly 400 naval families in two-story townhouse structures separated using a cul-del-sac street design. Upon the Military Base Closing Act in 1995, the United States government deeded the -acre Brownfield property to the city of Philadelphia. New luxury townhouses were built on the site by a private developer, John Westrum and Real Estate agent, daughter of the original Packer Park developer, Barbara Capozzi, who styled these homes for families. The colonial-styled architecture incorporated the "green technology" of environmentally adaptive re-use of existing piles and foundations, infrastructure, and materials previously built by the Navy. The existing street layout preserved green areas augmented with large back yards, open area pocket parks and tot lots. The streets and cul-de-sacs were renamed to memorialize sections of Italy to reflect the Italian-American population.

West (Siena Place)
The Packer Park community expanded in 2008 with the groundbreaking of a new townhouse community composed of 313-luxury-townhomes named Siena Place. The development is set on a 30-acre land parcel in South Philadelphia and uses the Packer Park neighborhood name in its marketing program. The newly created neighborhood  preserves open green spaces, and provides private garages and ample street parking. The home designs are traditional three-story brick town homes, each with distinctively unique features which enhances the streetscape. Close proximity to major highways, as well as the Philadelphia International Airport allow residents easy access to anywhere they wish to go. The community is home to several prominent Philadelphia professional athletes, including members of the Eagles, Phillies, Flyers and Wings because of the convenience and security the neighborhood offers.

East (Stella Maris Homes)
The Packer Park community name extended for a separate 1950s development of about 500 homes, commonly associated with the "Stella Maris" parish housing on 13th street for the priest and nuns until the buildings were completed on 10th and Bigler Street. Thereafter, the area took on the name of the 1960s Stadium built on vacant land to the south border and later demolished to make way for a baseball stadium and known as Veterans Stadium Homes. located west of Broad Street from Packer Avenue south to Geary Street and bordering the expansive parking lots of the Baseball Stadium. The parking lot border includes a large raised buffered zone of green space with dense trees and grass.

South (Franklin Delano Roosevelt (FDR) Park) 
This graceful parkland is amenity to Packer Park in non-residential parkland that was established in the late 1800s. It was originally named League Island Park and locally became known as the "Lakes", is an aesthetically landscaped designed park by the famous park architects Olmsted Brothers known for New York's Central Park.

Education

The School District of Philadelphia operates public schools.

The Free Library of Philadelphia Thomas F. Donatucci, Sr. Branch (formerly the Passyunk Branch) serves Packer Park. The library received its current name in 2004.

See also 

 Aquarama Aquarium Theater of the Sea
 Naval Hospital Philadelphia
 Sesquicentennial Exposition
 FDR Park

References

External links 
 Packer Park Civic Association
 Historic Photographs of Packer Park, PhillyHistory.org
 Sports Complex Special Services District
 Vendemmia Wine Fall Festival at Vendemmia Square Packer Park

Italian-American culture in Pennsylvania
Little Italys in the United States
South Philadelphia
Italian-American culture in Philadelphia